Demethylrebeccamycin-D-glucose O-methyltransferase (RebM) is an enzyme with systematic name S-adenosyl-L-methionine:demethylrebeccamycin-D-glucose O-methyltransferase. This enzyme catalyses the following chemical reaction

 4'-demethylrebeccamycin + S-adenosyl-L-methionine  rebeccamycin + S-adenosyl-L-homocysteine

Demethylrebeccamycin-D-glucose O-methyltransferase catalyses the last step in the biosynthesis of rebeccamycin, an indolocarbazole alkaloid produced by the Actinobacterium Lechevalieria aerocolonigenes.

References

External links 
 

EC 2.1.1